Kenzo Simons (born 13 April 2001) is a Dutch competitive swimmer of Surinamese descent who specializes in freestyle and butterfly. As a member of the Dutch relay team he won gold in the 4x50 m freestyle event during the 2021 European Short Course Championships, establishing a new national record.

Personal bests

References

External links
 

2001 births
Living people
Dutch male butterfly swimmers
Surinamese male swimmers
Sportspeople from Paramaribo
Dutch male freestyle swimmers
Medalists at the FINA World Swimming Championships (25 m)
European Aquatics Championships medalists in swimming
Swimmers at the 2018 Summer Youth Olympics
21st-century Dutch people
21st-century Surinamese people